HaSharon may refer to:

HaSharon Junction, commonly known as Beit Lid Junction, an important road junction in the Sharon region, Israel
HaSharon Park, an Israeli national park

See also
Havatzelet HaSharon, a moshav in central Israel
Hod HaSharon, a city in the Central District of Israel
Mishmar HaSharon, a kibbutz in central Israel
Ramat HaSharon, a city located on Israel's central coastal strip
Sharon (disambiguation)